The European Ecological Foundation (EEF) is a European organisation with the objective "to promote cooperation within the science of ecology in Europe".

Members

Its members are:

 British Ecological Society, United Kingdom and Ireland
 Gesellschaft für Ökologie, Germany, Austria, Switzerland, and Liechtenstein
 Société Française d'Ecologie, France and Belgium
 Swedish and Nordic Oikos Societies, Nordic countries
 Sociatá Italiana di Ecologia, Italy
 Dutch-Flemish Ecological Society (Necov), Netherlands and Flanders
 Polish Ecological Society Petecol, Poland
 Société d'Ecophysiologie, France
 Greek Ecologists' Association, Greece
 Turkish Ecological Society, Turkey
 Slovak Ecological Society, Slovakia
 Spanish Ecological Society, Spain
 Portuguese Ecological Society (SPECO), Portugal
 Romanian Ecological Society, Romania
 Czech Union of Ecologists, Czech Republic
 Hungarian Biological Society, Hungary
 Institute of Ecology, Poland
 Macedonian Ecological Society, North Macedonia
 Lithuanian Ecological Society, Lithuania

Presidents 

Presidents include:

 R. J. Berry 1990-1992
 R. Bornkamm 1993-1995
 Piet Nienhuis 1995-1999
 John Pantis 1999–2002
 Pehr H. Enckell 2002-2006
 Stefan Klotz 2006–present

External links 
 European Ecological Federation

Ecology organizations